Imperial Noble Consort (Chinese: 皇貴妃, Vietnamese: hoàng quý phi, Korean: 황귀비) was the title of women who ranked second in the imperial harem of China during most of the period spanning from 1457 to 1915. The title was also adopted in the Empire of Dainam (Vietnam) and the Empire of Korea.

List of titleholders

China 
 Ming:
Jingtai Emperor: Imperial Noble Consort Tang
Chenghua Emperor: Imperial Noble Consort Wan
Jiajing Emperor: Imperial Noble Consort Rong'an, Imperial Noble Consort Duanhe, Imperial Noble Consort Zhuangshun
Longqing Emperor: Imperial Noble Consort Li
Wanli Emperor: Imperial Noble Consort Li, Imperial Noble Consort Gong
Taichang Emperor: Imperial Noble Consort Kang
Tianqi Emperor: Imperial Noble Consort Kang, Imperial Noble Consort Hui
Chongzhen Emperor: Imperial Noble Consort Gongshu

 Qing:

 Shunzhi Emperor: Empress Xiaoxian
 Kangxi Emperor: Empress Xiaoyiren, Imperial Noble Consort Quehui, Imperial Noble Consort Jingmin, Imperial Noble Consort Dunyi
 Yongzheng Emperor: Imperial Noble Consort Dunsu, Imperial Noble Consort Chunque
 Qianlong Emperor: Step-Empress Nara, Empress Xiaoyichun, Imperial Noble Consort Huixian, Imperial Noble Consort Chunhui, Imperial Noble Consort Shujia, Imperial Noble Consort Qinggong, Imperial Noble Consort Zhemin
 Jiaqing Emperor: Empress Xiaoherui, Imperial Noble Consort Heyu, Imperial Noble Consort Gongshun
 Daoguang Emperor: Empress Xiaoquancheng, Empress Xiaojingcheng, Imperial Noble Consort Zhuangshun
 Xianfeng Emperor: Empress Xiaoqinxian, Imperial Noble Consort Zhuangjing, Imperial Noble Consort Duanke
 Tongzhi Emperor: Imperial Noble Consort Shushen, Imperial Noble Consort Gongsu, Imperial Noble Consort Xianzhe, Imperial Noble Consort Dunhui
 Guangxu Emperor: Imperial Noble Consort Wenjing, Imperial Noble Consort Keshun

Vietnam 
Empire of Dainam:
Emperor Tự Đức: Empress Lệ Thiên Anh
Emperor Đồng Khánh: Empress Phụ Thiên Thuần
Emperor Thành Thái: Nguyễn Gia Thị Anh

Korea 
Empire of Korea:
Emperor Gojong: Imperial Noble Consort Sunheon

References

Royal titles